Maiestas belona is a species of bug from the Cicadellidae family that is endemic to India. It was originally placed within Recilia as R. belonus, but a 2009 revision placed it into Maiestas.

References

Insects described in 1998
Endemic fauna of India
Insects of India
Maiestas